The Northeast Conference women's basketball tournament is the conference championship tournament in women's basketball for the Northeast Conference. It is a single-elimination tournament involving 8 of the 10 league schools, and seeding is based on regular-season records with head-to-head match-up as a tie-breaker.

The tournament has been held since 1986, although the winner has only received the  conference's automatic bid to the NCAA women's basketball tournament since 1994. Between the 1987 and 1988, when the NEC was still called the ECAC Metro Conference, the tournament was known as the ECAC Metro Conference women's basketball tournament.

The highest seeds face off against the corresponding lowest seeds, with the two remaining teams facing off in the Finals to determine the champion.

Results

Champions

 Central Connecticut, Merrimack, and Stonehill have not yet won an NEC tournament.
 Bryant, Loyola Maryland, Marist, Rider, and UMBC never won the tournament as an NEC member.
 Schools highlighted in pink are former members of the NEC

See also
 Northeast Conference men's basketball tournament

References